Dalhart is a city in Dallam and Hartley counties in the U.S. state of Texas, and the county seat of Dallam County. The population was 7,930 at the 2010 census.

History

Founded in 1901, Dalhart is named for its location on the border of Dallam and Hartley Counties; its name is a portmanteau of the names of the two counties. The city was founded at the site of a railroad junction, which heavily contributed to its early growth.

Dalhart was in the center of the Dust Bowl, an area adversely affected by a long period of drought and dust storms during the Great Depression of the 1930s. Here, Tex Thornton, operating on the now debunked concussion theory, coaxed today's inflation-adjusted equivalent of $1 million from the locals on claims he could fire rocket-powered explosives into the clouds and cause rain.

Geography

Dalhart is located in northwestern Texas at  (36.060856, −102.518656).
Dalhart sits in the Southern Great Plains and is heavily impacted by its agriculture industry. Dalhart is about 70 miles northwest of Amarillo, the nearest city that has a population over 100,000.

Dalhart sits at the intersection of U.S. Highway 87, 385, and 54. Two miles south of Dalhart is the former Rita Blanca State Park, site of Rita Blanca Canyon, now maintained by the City of Dalhart. It is 1,680 acres, plus the 160 acres of Lake Rita Blanca, on Rita Blanca Creek.  The park has playground equipment and hiking/biking/riding trails.  The city has added a Lake Center at which guests can check-out various items such as bicycles, board games, fishing poles & tackle, golf discs, and more.

Dalhart is located closer to six other state capitals than to Texas' capital of Austin.

Climate

Dalhart experiences a semiarid climate (Köppen BSk) with cool, dry winters and hot summers.   The average annual rainfall of less than  strongly influences both Dalhart's ecological climate and agricultural practices, especially center-pivot irrigation.

Since records began in 1948, the hottest temperature in Dalhart has been  on June 26, 2011, and the coldest  on January 4, 1959. On average, 65 afternoons each year will reach or top , 133.8 mornings will fall to or below freezing, 10.1 afternoons will fail to top freezing, and two mornings will fall to or below .

Demographics

In December 2015, the Seattle Post-Intelligencer voted Dalhart number eight of the 10 "most conservative" cities in the United States in regard to campaign contributions. Other West Texas communities in the most conservative lineup are Hereford (number one), Monahans (number five), and Childress (number nine). In contrast, Vashon Island, Washington, was named the "most liberal" city in the nation regarding political donations.

2020 Census

As of the 2020 United States census, there were 8,447 people, 2,956 households, and 2,041 families residing in the city.

2010 Census 
As of the 2010 Census, Dalhart had a population of 7,930 living in 2,957 housing locations;  50.3% of the population was male, with 49.7% being female. The census revealed that 28.9% of the population was under the age of 18, while 12.4% of citizens were over the age of 65.  With an area of 4.78 square miles, the City of Dalhart has a population density of 1659.0 persons/square mile.

Census data showed that 84.0% of the population identified as White, while 1.2% identified as Black/African American, 0.7% identified as Asian, 0.9% identified as Native American, and 0.1% were Pacific Islander.  About 10.5% of the remaining population identified themselves as some other race, while 2.5% considered themselves to be of two or more races, and 34.0% of the population identified themselves as Hispanic or Latino of any race.

In 2010, 9.9% of the population identified as being foreign-born, with 25.4% of households in Dalhart speaking a primary language other than English at home.  Data demonstrated that 79.6% of residents over 25 had earned at least a high-school diploma, while 16.4% had obtained a bachelor's degree or higher.

Over the 4-year period between 2007 and 2011, the median household income was $53,210, with a larger mean (average) household income of $69,190.  The median per-capita income was $24,979.  The census showed that 6.4% of the population lived below the federal poverty line, and 3.4% of the population was unemployed.  Around 71.1% of Dalhart residents owned a home, with the median home value being $91,800.  As of 2010, 829 businesses were registered in the city.

Economy 
Dalhart's economy is centered around agribusiness, including farming, ranching, feedlot operations, large-scale pig farms, and more recently, a cheese processing plant. Dalhart is also home to a state prison.

During the peak operating period of the XIT Ranch, the land was in native grass. Some land was diverted into dry farmland, but the rain was insufficient to make it productive. A few irrigation wells were drilled in areas where the soil was not sandy and was level enough for row irrigation. Later, center pivot irrigation, credited to Colorado farmer Frank Zybach in 1949, was introduced and was found to be ideal for the area's rolling sandy soils. About the same time, large feedlots were built due to the low-humidity climate. This created a good market for corn, which is the major crop grown by farmers in the area.

In the mid-2000s, a combination of tax incentives, Texas' relatively unrestricted environmental regulations, and Dalhart's existing agricultural infrastructure attracted industrial dairy farms to the area.  In 2007, Hilmar Cheese Company of California capitalized on the resulting milk availability, opening a major production plant in Dalhart.  Texas Governor Rick Perry visited Dalhart to speak at the company's official welcoming ceremony, reiterating the company's projection that 2000 new jobs would be created in the region by the emerging dairy product production industry.  This factory and the surrounding dairies are a significant emerging subsector of Dalhart's established agribusiness culture.

The international agribusiness company Cargill owns a 21,500-acre hog-production site near Dalhart.

Arts and culture 

Dalhart is known as the "XIT City" because of its relationship with the historic XIT Ranch. The ranch was a  plot of land traded in exchange for the construction of the Texas State Capitol in Austin. The ranch was dissolved in 1912, but its history is celebrated with the city's XIT Museum and the XIT Rodeo and Reunion. Held annually on the first full Thursday through Sunday weekend of August, the event includes the world's largest free barbecue, junior rodeo, Professional Rodeo Cowboys Association events, and three nights of live music.

The Muscle Car Party Weekend is held each year in May, and includes a classic car show, bicycle drag races, and dinner and dance. The events are sponsored by the Dalhart Cruzers Car Club, and each year, the club raffles a classic car.

Education 
The Dalhart Independent School District serves the city of Dalhart. The district has an elementary school, intermediate school, junior high school, and high school. Students attend Dalhart High School, which competes athletically and scholastically in District 1 Division 3A of Texas' University Interscholastic League.  In 2012, Frank Phillips College opened a branch in Dalhart, offering both credit and community-education classes.

Media 
The Dalhart Texan was established in 1901, and is published in Dalhart. The newspaper is currently published twice a week and has been owned by the Hogue family for the past 60 years.  Susan Hogue Clay is the present owner and publisher.

Infrastructure

Prison system 
The Texas Department of Criminal Justice's Dalhart Unit prison is located in unincorporated Hartley County, near Dalhart.

Gallery

See also 

 Dalhart Municipal Airport

Notes

References

Further reading 
 Timothy Egan, The Worst Hard Time (Mariner Books, 2006).

External links 

 City of Dalhart official website
 Dalhart Chamber of Commerce

Cities in Texas
County seats in Texas
Cities in Dallam County, Texas
Cities in Hartley County, Texas
Articles containing video clips